Trilinear interpolation is a method of multivariate interpolation on a 3-dimensional regular grid.  It approximates the value of a function at an intermediate point  within the local axial rectangular prism linearly, using function data on the lattice points.   For an arbitrary, unstructured mesh (as used in finite element analysis), other methods of interpolation must be used; if all the mesh elements are tetrahedra (3D simplices), then barycentric coordinates provide a straightforward procedure.

Trilinear interpolation is frequently used in numerical analysis, data analysis, and computer graphics.

Compared to linear and bilinear interpolation 

Trilinear interpolation is the extension of linear interpolation, which operates in spaces with dimension , and bilinear interpolation, which operates with dimension , to dimension . These interpolation schemes all use polynomials of order 1, giving an accuracy of order 2, and it requires  adjacent pre-defined values surrounding the interpolation point. There are several ways to arrive at trilinear interpolation, which is equivalent to 3-dimensional tensor B-spline interpolation of order 1, and the trilinear interpolation operator is also a tensor product of 3 linear interpolation operators.

Method

where  indicates the lattice point below , and  indicates the lattice point above  and similarly for

 

 

Finally we interpolate these values along  (walking through a line):

This gives us a predicted value for the point.

The result of trilinear interpolation is independent of the order of the interpolation steps along the three axes: any other order, for instance along , then along , and finally along , produces the same value.

The above operations can be visualized as follows: First we find the eight corners of a cube that surround our point of interest.

In practice, a trilinear interpolation is identical to two bilinear interpolation combined with a linear interpolation:

Alternative algorithm
An alternative way to write the solution to the interpolation problem is

where the coefficients are found by solving the linear system

yielding the result

See also
 Linear interpolation
 Bilinear interpolation
 Tricubic interpolation
 Radial interpolation
 Tetrahedral interpolation
 Spherical Linear Interpolation

External links
pseudo-code from NASA, describes an iterative inverse trilinear interpolation (given the vertices and the value of C find Xd, Yd and Zd).
Paul Bourke, Interpolation methods, 1999. Contains a very clever and simple method to find trilinear interpolation that is based on binary logic and can be extended to any dimension (Tetralinear, Pentalinear, ...).
Kenwright, Free-Form Tetrahedron Deformation. International Symposium on Visual Computing. Springer International Publishing, 2015 .

Multivariate interpolation